Sri Sarada College for Women, Salem, is a women's general degree college located in Salem, Tamil Nadu. It was established in the year 1961. The college is affiliated with Periyar University. This college offers different courses in arts, commerce and science.

Departments

Science

Physics
Chemistry
Mathematics
Statistics
Botany
Zoology
Computer Science

Arts and Commerce

Tamil
English
History
Economics
Business Administration
Commerce

Accreditation
The college is  recognized by the University Grants Commission (UGC).

References

External links

Educational institutions established in 1961
1961 establishments in Madras State
Colleges affiliated to Periyar University
Education in Salem, Tamil Nadu